Ruben Gerardo Grighini (born 11 January 1987), commonly known as Ruben, is an Argentinian footballer who last played for Rovigo Calcio. He made his Serie B debut with FBC Unione Venezia in the 2004-2005 season.

References

External links 
 

1987 births
Living people
Argentine footballers
Argentine expatriate footballers
Serie A players
Serie B players
Venezia F.C. players
Expatriate footballers in Italy
Argentine expatriate sportspeople in Italy
Association football forwards
Footballers from Buenos Aires